Sharwa (also known as Tchevi, Sherwin, Sarwaye) is an Afro-Asiatic language spoken in Cameroon in Far North Province.  There are signs of language shift to Fulfulde.

Sharwa speakers (5,100) are also called Tchévi, which is their largest town, in the southern part of Bourrha commune (Mayo-Tsanaga district, Far North Region). Sharwa is also spoken in the Northern Region, in Mayo-Louti department (Mayo-Oulo commune). They are mostly assimilated with the Gude.

Notes

External links 
 Information about speakers of Sharwa

Biu-Mandara languages
Languages of Cameroon